Keep On Walkin' is the third album released by the Grascals on July 15, 2008. The album is a variety of songs, either entirely new songs coming which have been introduced the song line up just a few months before the album, or songs that have been played for quite a while but never made previous cuts for albums.

Track listing

 "Feeling Blue" (Aubrey Holt)2:36
 "Sad Wind Sighs" (Holt)3:29
 "Choices" (Billy Yates, Mike Curtis)3:10
 "Only Daddy That'll Walk the Line" (Jimmy Bryant)2:18
 "Indiana" (Harley Allen, Jamie Johnson))3:05
 "Rollin' in My Sweet Baby's Arms" (traditional)2:59
 "Today I Started Loving You Again" (Merle Haggard, Bonnie Owens)3:26
 "Can't You Hear That Whistle Blow" (Chris Dodson, Sonny Throckmorton)3:06
 "Remembering" (Allen))3:25
 "Keep On Walkin'" (Charley Stefl, Johnson)3:22
 "Happy Go Lucky" (Holt)2:50
 "Farther Along" (traditional)4:11

The Grascals
Terry Eldrege - lead vocals, guitar
Jamie Johnson - lead and harmony vocals
Terry Smith - lead and harmony vocals, bass guitar
Danny Roberts - mandolin; bass vocals on "Farther Along"
Aaron McDaris - banjo, guitar; harmony vocals on "Keep On Walkin'"

Guest musicians
Vince Gill - guest vocals on "Sad Wind Sighs"
Andy Hall — dobro
Jimmy Mattingly - fiddle
Hargus "Pig" Robbins — piano
Steve Turner — drums
Kent Wells — rhythm guitar

Chart performance

References 

2008 albums
The Grascals albums
Rounder Records albums